Corner With Love is a 2007 Taiwanese drama starring Show Lo and Barbie Hsu (aka Da S). It was produced by Comic Ritz International Production (可米瑞智國際藝能有限公司) with Angie Chai (柴智屏) and Huang Jing (黃京) as producers and directed by Lin Helong (林合隆). The drama started filming in May 2006 and wrapped on 13 August 2006. It was filmed on location in Taipei and Kaohsiung in Taiwan; and in Shanghai, China.

It was first broadcast in Taiwan on free-to-air China Television (CTV) from 7 January 2007 to 22 April 2007, on Sundays at 22:00. It was also shown on cable TV Eastern Television (ETTV) from 22 January 2007 on Saturdays at 16:30.

Corner With Love was nominated for Best Marketing Programme of the Year at the 42nd Golden Bell Awards in 2007.

Cast

Synopsis
Xinlei (Barbie Hsu) is an intelligent, confident and beautiful girl who has never known a day of hardship. Her father is a wealthy business tycoon in Shanghai and she is engaged to Yin Shangdong (Chen Zhikai) who in her eyes is also perfect in every way. She lives a life of fairytale as everyone dote and treat her like a princess. Until one day, she meets Qin Lang (Show Lo), when her car and his bicycle crash into each other by accident at a corner. Qin Lang is a frustrated artist whose father abandoned him and his mother to pursue his passion for painting. He went to Shanghai with the hopes of pursuing his dream of becoming an artist but was cheated out of his money, passport and plane ticket. In order to earn enough money to go home to Taiwan he works as a cook, making oyster omelette, a skill passed down by his grandmother.

Xinlei and Qin Lang meet again when she goes to a restaurant that specialises in Taiwanese food, that Qin Lang happens to works at. She wanted to learn how to make oyster omelette, in order to impress her fiancé's parents with her cooking skills. He is initially reluctant to teach her as he is annoyed by her princess complex but at the same time, he is drawn to her. After much bickering and mis-understanding they become friends.

Then, Xinlei's parents' company goes bankrupt and they go into hiding to escape their debtors. They mis-guidedly thought that Shangdong would take care of her, hence only left her a plane ticket and a key to their house in Taiwan. Unfortunately, Shangdong breaks off their engagement, at the insistence of his parents, and becomes engaged to another girl whose family can help them financially. Meanwhile, Xinlei is left to rely on her best friend Xi Xian and Qin Lang, who found himself wanting to protect her and does everything in his power to cheer her up. However at the bidding of his grandmother, he had to leave Xibei to return to Taiwan, thinking that they would never meet again. Then, after seeing Xinlei at his engagement party, Shangdong is unable to go through with it. So his parents asked her to break away and leave Shanghai. Whereupon she goes to Taiwan to stay in the house her parents left her.

Coincidentally, it turns out that the house that was left to Xinlei by her parents is Qin Lang's house. Xinlei tried to drive Qin Lang's family out of the house which infuriated his grandmother and wanted Xinlei out of the house since she can show no proof of ownership of the house. Knowing that Xinlei has nowhere else to go, Qin Lang lied to his grandmother saying that Xinlei is his girlfriend who is now penniless and homeless and plead to let her stay. The grandmother reluctantly lets her stay under the condition that she has to help with the household chores and she has to find a job and pay her rent for staying in the house.

A series of unfortunate events happen which leads Xinlei to face up to her life's situation and learn to adapt to her new environment. She is unable to give up her princess complex but little by little, warmed up to Qin Lang's family and the kind of life they live. In the end, she would have to make a choice between staying as a princess in her castle or to lead a simple life of a commoner for love.

Ratings
Before the pilot episode was aired, Barbie Hsu bet that Corner 's highest rating would be around 2.9, while Chai Zhiping bet on around 3.3. It ended up posting a final average of 2.81, with a peak at around 3.25.

Rival dramas on air at the same time：
 Chinese Television System (CTS): Hanazakarino Kimitachihe / Summer x Summer
 Taiwan Television (TTV): Engagement for Love (愛情經紀約) / My Lucky Star

Soundtrack

Corner * With Love Original Soundtrack (轉角*遇到愛 電視原聲帶) was released on 19 January 2007 by Various Artists under Sony Music Entertainment (Taiwan). It contains twelve songs, in which four songs are various instrumental versions of the six original songs. "Ai De Yongqi" or "Love's Courage" by Megan Lai (賴雅妍) was the opening theme song of the series.

Track listing

In addition, there are two songs not included in the original soundtrack: The ending theme song entitled "Ai Zhuan Jiao" or "Love*Corner", and an insert song, "Ji Fen" or "How Many Points", both by Show Lo released in his 4th album Speshow Corner With Love Special Edition.

Books
 Corner * With Love TV Drama Novel (轉角*遇到愛電視小說) - 
 Corner * With Love TV Drama Novel (Kingstone Limited Edition) (轉角*遇到愛電視小說 金石堂限量版) - 
 Corner * With Love (轉角*遇到愛珍藏手繪本) - Author: Giddens Ko (九把刀) -

Production
 Show reportedly learnt the art of oyster omelette making in a night market as his character is a 3rd generation oyster omelette stall operator.
 In the drama Show's kiss with Da S is his on-screen first kiss.

International broadcasts

See also
 Cho một tình yêu (VTV3) (October 7, 2010 - February 10, 2011) starring Mỹ Tâm & Tuấn Hưng

References

External links
  Comic Ritz official homepage
  CTV official homepage
  ETTV official homepage

China Television original programming
2007 Taiwanese television series debuts
2007 Taiwanese television series endings
Television shows written by Wen Yu-fang